Dmitrii Kiselev (born 15 November 1994) is a Russian handball player for HBC CSKA Moscow and the Russian national team.

He participated at the 2017 World Men's Handball Championship.

References

1994 births
Living people
Sportspeople from Voronezh Oblast
Russian male handball players
RK Vardar players
Expatriate handball players
Russian expatriate sportspeople in North Macedonia